= Lise Baron =

French filmmaker

- Born: France
- Occupation: director
- Notable work: Eprouvantes éprouvettes (2021)
- Awards: The Grand Jury Prize at Justice Documentary Festival Paris 2023

Lise Baron is a French documentary filmmaker. She lives in Nantes.

== Biography ==
After studying ancient history, Lise Baron worked as a production manager and literary director for various documentary production companies. Later, she moved into directing. Her first film, "Students, All to the Factory! – Journeys of Working-Class Maoists," was made in 2018. In this documentary, she interviewed former Parisian students who, after the events of May 1968, went to work in factories.

In 2020, she co-directed a documentary with Aurélien Bonnet on medically assisted reproduction. Given that both Lise Baron and Aurélien Bonnet had personal experiences with assisted reproduction, they explored their own journey and compared it to those of several other couples.

In 2021, she completed her fifth documentary, focusing on Marguerite Duras as a writer while also delving into her role as a filmmaker and the political aspects of her character.

== Filmography ==
Year	Title	Role	Notes
2018	Etudiants, tous à l'usine ! – Itinéraires de maoïstes ouvriers	Director	Documentary
2018	La traite atlantique, archipel de la mémoire	Director	Documentary
2019	Erika, au nom de la mer	Director	Documentary
2020	Éprouvantes éprouvettes	Director	Documentary
2020	Marguerite, l'écriture et la vie	Director	Documentary
2022	Dans nos prisons, histoire d'une lutte	Director	Documentary
2023	les Années sida, à la mort, à la vie	Director	Documentary

== Awards ==
- 2023 : Grand Prize of Jury at Justice Documentary Festival Paris
